is a Japanese voice actress affiliated with Production Baobab. Her best-known role is voice acting a major character from Crayon Shin-Chan, Kazama Tōru.

Voice roles

Anime television series
Osomatsu-kun (1988) (Hata-bou, Karamatsu)

Unknown date
21 Emon (Rigel)
Bonobono (Mari Mashiba)
Crayon Shin-chan (Tōru Kazama, Shiro)
Detective Conan (Suzuko Tanaka)
Idol Angel Yokoso Yoko (Mario)
Master Keaton (Victor (young))
Miracle Girls (Takae Matsunaga)
Mister Ajikko (Kōji Nakada)

Anime OVAs
Mobile Suit Gundam 0083: Stardust Memory (1991) (Cima Garahau)
Tenchi Muyo! (1992) (Tenchi Masaki (child))

Anime films
Doraemon: Nobita and the Birth of Japan (1989)(Boy)
Mobile Suit Gundam 0083: The Last Blitz of Zeon (xxxx) (Cima Garahau)

Video games
Natsuki Crisis Battle (xxxx) (Akira Kandori)
Magical Drop F (xxxx) (Hierophant, Sun)
Mobile Suit Gundam: Gihren's Ambition (xxxx) (Cima Garahau)
Mobile Suit Gundam: Encounters in Space (xxxx) (Cima Garahau)
SD Gundam G Generation (xxxx) (Cima Garahau)
Super Robot Wars (xxxx) (Cima Garahau)
Tales of Rebirth (xxxx) (Zilva Madigan)

External links
Mari Mashiba at Production Baobab (Japanese)

1959 births
Living people
Voice actresses from Gunma Prefecture
Japanese voice actresses
20th-century Japanese actresses
21st-century Japanese actresses
Production Baobab voice actors